' and ' are an Australian EDM, electro house and progressive house duo, better known by their stage name The Twins. After signing with Sony/ATV Music Publishing at 18 years of age, the sisters pursued careers as songwriting partners and, in 2008, they signed with Fredrik Olsson and his Swedish music publishing company Razor Boy Music Publishing.

References

External links

Australian record producers
Australian electronic music groups
2010 establishments in Australia
Musical groups established in 2010
Australian house music groups
Queensland musical groups
Australian musical duos
Twin musical duos
Australian DJs
Australian twins
Musicians from Gold Coast, Queensland
Electronic dance music duos
Participants in Australian reality television series
Women DJs
Female musical duos
Living people
Year of birth missing (living people)